Golden Hours was an American  juvenile magazine published by Norman Munro in the late 19th and early 20th centuries.

History and profile
Golden Hours was first published in January 1888. W. C. Dunn was the first editor. In 1904 the periodical became a family monthly.       

H. Irving Hancock produced more than 50 serials for this magazine between 1889 and 1904. The magazine was based in New York.

References

External links

  – where it is a "non-genre" magazine

Children's magazines published in the United States
Defunct magazines published in the United States
Magazines established in 1888
Magazines disestablished in 1904
Magazines published in Cincinnati